In chemistry, a parent hydride in IUPAC nomenclature refers to a main group compound with the formula , where A is a main group element. The names of parent hydrides end with -ane, analogous with the nomenclature for alkanes. Derivatives of parent hydrides are named by appending prefixes or suffixes to the name of the parent hydride to indicate the substituents that replace the hydrogen atoms.

Parent hydrides are used in both the organic nomenclature, and inorganic nomenclature systems.

*extensive body of chemistry

Reactions and structure
Parent hydrides are useful reference compounds, but many are nonexistent or unstable.  Group III parent hydrides exist only under extraordinary conditions.  Borane dimerizes irreversibly.  Gallane and heavier congeners polymerize, sometimes with loss of hydrogen. Plumbane and bismuthane, stibane, indane, thallane are unstable.

See also 

Borderline hydrides
Hydride
Preferred IUPAC name

References

Chemical nomenclature